Piedras Coloradas is a village or populated centre in the south of Paysandú Department in western Uruguay.

Geography
The railroad track Paysandú - Paso de los Toros passes through the village. The headwaters of the stream Arroyo Sauce are to its southeast, while to the southwest are the headwaters of Arroyo Valdez.

Population
In 2011 it had a population of 1,094.
 
Source: Instituto Nacional de Estadística de Uruguay

References

External links
INE map of Piedras Coloradas

Populated places in the Paysandú Department